Trophonopsis is a genus of sea snails, marine gastropod mollusks in the family Muricidae, the murex snails or rock snails.

Species
Species within the genus Trophonopsis include:
 Trophonopsis aberrans (Houart, 1991)
 † Trophonopsis acharya (Yokoyama, 1926) 
 Trophonopsis alboranensis (Smriglio, Mariottini & Bonfitto 1997)
 v Trophonopsis aulacophora (Cossmann, 1913) 
 Trophonopsis barvicensis (Johnston, 1825)
 † Trophonopsis bonneti (Cossmann, 1913) 
 Trophonopsis breviata (Jeffreys, 1882)
 † Trophonopsis cuisensis (Cossmann, 1913) 
 Trophonopsis densilamellata Golikov & Gulbin, 1977: synonym of Scabrotrophon densilamellatus (Golikov & Gulbin, 1977) (original combination)
 Trophonopsis diazi (Durham, 1942)
 Trophonopsis droueti (Dautzenberg, 1889)
 Trophonopsis kayae Habe, 1981
 Trophonopsis mioplectos (Barnard, 1959)
 Trophonopsis muricata (Montagu, 1803)
 † Trophonopsis multistriata (Deshayes, 1865) 
 Trophonopsis orpheus (Gould, 1849)
 Trophonopsis pistillum (Barnard, 1959)
 Trophonopsis polycyma Kuroda, 1953
 Trophonopsis sparacioi Smriglio, Mariottini & Di Giulio, 2015
 † Trophonopsis squamulata (Brocchi, 1814) 
 † Trophonopsis sublamellosa (Deshayes, 1835)

Species brought into synonymy 
 Subgenus Trophonopsis (Austrotrophon) Dall, 1902: synonym of Austrotrophon Dall, 1902
 Subgenus Trophonopsis (Boreotrophon) P. Fischer, 1884: synonym of Boreotrophon P. Fischer, 1884
 Trophonopsis apolyonis (Dall, 1919): synonym of Boreotrophon apolyonis (Dall, 1919)
 Trophonopsis bassetti Houart, 1998: synonym of Enatimene bassetti (Houart, 1998)
 Trophonopsis carduelis (Watson, 1882): synonym of Pagodula carduelis (Watson, 1882)
  † Trophonopsis carinata (Bivona, 1832): synonym of † Pagodula carinata (Bivona, 1832)
  † Trophonopsis carinatus: synonym of † Pagodula carinata (Bivona, 1832)
 Trophonopsis clathratus (Linnaeus, 1767): synonym of Boreotrophon clathratus (Linnaeus, 1767)
 Trophonopsis clavatus Sars, GO, 1879  synonym of Boreotrophon clavatus (Sars, 1878)
 Trophonopsis crystallinus Kuroda, 1953: synonym of Abyssotrophon crystallinus (Kuroda, 1953)
 Trophonopsis curta Locard, 1892: synonym of Trophonopsis muricata (Montagu, 1803)
 Trophonopsis delicatus Kuroda, 1953: synonym of Abyssotrophon delicatus (Kuroda, 1953)
 Trophonopsis densicostata Golikov in Golikov & Scarlato, 1985: synonym of Scabrotrophon densicostatus (Golikov in Golikov & Scarlato, 1985)
 Trophonopsis densilamellata Golikov & Gulbin, 1977: synonym of Scabrotrophon densilamellatus (Golikov & Gulbin, 1977) (original combination)
 Trophonopsis fabricii Beck in Møller, 1842: synonym of Scabrotrophon fabricii (Møller, 1842)
 Trophonopsis fasciolarioides (Pastorino & Scarabino, 2008): synonym of Enixotrophon fasciolarioides (Pastorino & Scarabino, 2008)
 Trophonopsis forestii Ruggieri, 1947: synonym of Trophonopsis muricata (Montagu, 1803)
 Trophonopsis gortani Ruggieri, 1947: synonym of Trophonopsis muricata (Montagu, 1803)
 Trophonopsis gruveli Dautzenberg, 1910: synonym of Vaughtia gruveli (Dautzenberg, 1910) (original combination)
 Trophonopsis hubbsi Rokop, 1972: synonym of Abyssotrophon hubbsi (Rokop, 1972)
 Trophonopsis kamchatkanus (Dall, 1902): synonym of Scabrotrophon kamchatkanus (Dall, 1902)
 Trophonopsis keepi (Strong & Hertlein, 1937): synonym of Boreotrophon pedroanus (Arnold, 1903)
 Trophonopsis lasius (Dall, 1919): synonym of Scabrotrophon lasius (Dall, 1919)
 Trophonopsis longurio Bucquoy & Dautzenberg, 1882: synonym of Trophonopsis muricata (Montagu, 1803)
 Trophonopsis magnifica Golikov & Sirenko, 1992: synonym of Nipponotrophon magnificus (Golikov & Sirenko, 1992)
 Trophonopsis minirotunda (Houart, 1986): synonym of Leptotrophon minirotundus (Houart, 1986)
 Trophonopsis multigradus (Houart, 1990): synonym of Pagodula multigrada (Houart, 1990)
 Trophonopsis nana Egorov, 1994: synonym of Boreotrophon kamchatkanus Dall, 1902
 Trophonopsis nodulosa Golikov, 1985: synonym of Scabrotrophon nodulosus (Golikov, in Golikov & Scarlato, 1985)
 Trophonopsis obtuseliratus (Schepman, 1911): synonym of Enixotrophon obtuseliratus (Schepman, 1911)
 Trophonopsis odisseyi Golikov & Sirenko, 1992: synonym of Abyssotrophon odisseyi (Golikov & Sirenko, 1992)
 Trophonopsis plicilaminatus (Verco, 1909): synonym of Pagodula plicilaminata (Verco, 1909)
 Trophonopsis scarlatoi Golikov & Sirenko, 1992: synonym of Scabrotrophon scarlatoi (Golikov & Sirenko, 1992)
 Trophonopsis segmentata (Verco, 1909): synonym of Leptotrophon segmentatus (Verco, 1909)
 Trophonopsis shingoi Tiba, 1981: synonym of Nipponotrophon shingoi (Tiba, 1981)
 Trophonopsis similidroueti (Houart, 1989): synonym of Enixotrophon similidroueti (Houart, 1989)
 Trophonopsis soyoae Okutani, 1959: synonym of Abyssotrophon soyoae (Okutani, 1959)
 Trophonopsis stuarti (E. A. Smith, 1880): synonym of Nipponotrophon stuarti (E. A. Smith, 1880)
 Trophonopsis tegularis Golikov & Gulbin, 1977: synonym of Scabrotrophon tegularis (Golikov & Gulbin, 1977)
 Trophonopsis tolomius (Dall, 1919): synonym of Boreotrophon tolomius (Dall, 1919)
 Trophonopsis tripherus (Dall, 1902): synonym of Boreotrophon tripherus Dall, 1902
 Trophonopsis truncata (Strom, 1768): synonym of Boreotrophon truncatus (Ström, 1768)
 Trophonopsis undocostata Golikov & Sirenko, 1992: synonym of Scabrotrophon undocostatus (Golikov & Sirenko, 1992)
 † Trophonopsis varicosissimus (Michelotti, 1841): synonym of † Pagodula carinata (Bivona, 1832) 
 Trophonopsis yurii Egorov, 1994: synonym of Scabrotrophon yurii (Egorov, 1994)
 Trophonopsis ziczac Tiba, 1981: synonym of Pagodula ziczac (Tiba, 1981)

References

External links
 Bucquoy E., Dautzenberg P. & Dollfus G. (1882-1886). Les mollusques marins du Roussillon. Tome Ier. Gastropodes. Paris, J.B. Baillière & fils 570 p., 66 pl. [pp. 1-40, pl. 1-5, February 1882; pp. 41-84, pl. 6-10, August 1882; pp. 85-135, pl. 11-15, February 1883; pp. 136-196, pl. 16-20, August 1883; pp. 197-222, pl. 21-25, January 1884; pp.223-258, pl. 26-30, February 1884; pp. 259-298, pl. 31-35, August 1884; pp.299-342, pl. 36-40, September 1884; p. 343-386, pl. 41-45, February 1885; p. 387-418, pl. 46-50, August 1885; pp. 419-454, pl. pl. 51-60, January 1886; p. 455-486, pl. 56-60, April 1886; p. 487-570, pl. 61-66, October 1886 
  Kazutaka Amano, Trophonopsis Bucquoy, Dautzenberg and Dollfus, 1882 (Gastropoda, Muricidae) from the Plio-Pleistocene deposits in Japan, Paleontological Research 10(2):163-176. 2006,  

 
Pagodulinae